Frank Henderson (1836 – 21 July 1889) was a Scottish Liberal politician who sat in the House of Commons from 1880 to 1885.

Early life 
Henderson was the son of Henry Henderson, a leather merchant of Dundee, and his wife Anne Lindsay, daughter of James Lindsay. He was educated at the High School of Dundee.

Career 
At the 1880 general election Henderson was elected as the member of parliament (MP) for Dundee. He held the seat until the 1885 general election, when he did not stand again.

Personal life 
Henderson married Ellen Isabella Scroggie, daughter of David Scroggie of Laurencekirk, Kincardineshire.

Henderson died 21 July 1889 at the age of 53.

References

External links
 

1836 births
1889 deaths
Scottish Liberal Party MPs
Members of the Parliament of the United Kingdom for Scottish constituencies
UK MPs 1880–1885
Politicians from Dundee
People educated at the High School of Dundee
Members of the Parliament of the United Kingdom for Dundee constituencies